The 2013 WNBA season is the 17th season for the Los Angeles Sparks of the Women's National Basketball Association.

Transactions

WNBA Draft
The following are the Sparks' selections in the 2013 WNBA Draft.

Trades

Personnel changes

Additions

Subtractions

Roster

Depth

Season standings

Schedule

Preseason

|- style="background:#fcc;"
		 | 1 
		 | May 12
		 |  Seattle
		 | 
		 | Ebony Hoffman (8)
		 | Paola Ferrari (6)
		 | Coleman, O'Hea, & Abdi (2)
		 | Walter Pyramid at Long Beach State1524
		 | 0–1
|- style="background:#fcc;"
		 | 2 
		 | May 19
		 |  Tulsa
		 | 
		 | Kristi Toliver (11)
		 | Candace Parker (7)
		 | Lindsey Harding (4)
		 | SRC Arena1917
		 | 0–2

Regular season

|- style="background:#cfc;"
		 | 1 
		 | May 26
		 |  Seattle
		 | 
		 | Kristi Toliver (17)
		 | Jantel Lavender (6)
		 | Lindsey Harding (8)
		 | Staples Center10090
		 | 1–0

|- style="background:#fcc;"
		 | 2 
		 | June 1
		 | @ San Antonio
		 | 
		 | Candace Parker (27)
		 | Candace Parker (20)
		 | Lindsey Harding (5)
		 | AT&T Center6081
		 | 1–1
|- style="background:#cfc;"
		 | 3 
		 | June 8
		 |  Tulsa
		 | 
		 | Kristi Toliver (21)
		 | Candace Parker (13)
		 | Lindsey Harding (8)
		 | Staples Center6110
		 | 2–1
|- style="background:#fcc;"
		 | 4 
		 | June 14
		 | @ Phoenix
		 | 
		 | Kristi Toliver (18)
		 | Nneka Ogwumike (10)
		 | Candace Parker (3)
		 | US Airways Center13065
		 | 2–2
|- style="background:#cfc;"
		 | 5 
		 | June 15
		 |  San Antonio
		 | 
		 | Nneka Ogwumike (16)
		 | Nneka Ogwumike (7)
		 | Parker & Toliver (6)
		 | Staples Center6980
		 | 3–2
|- style="background:#cfc;"
		 | 6 
		 | June 21
		 |  Minnesota
		 | 
		 | Kristi Toliver (19)
		 | Ogwumike, Parker, & Lavender (8)
		 | Nneka Ogwumike (5)
		 | Staples Center6490
		 | 4–2
|- style="background:#cfc;"
		 | 7 
		 | June 23
		 |  Washington
		 | 
		 | Lindsey Harding (22)
		 | Nneka Ogwumike (9)
		 | Lindsey Harding (7)
		 | Staples Center9651
		 | 5–2
|- style="background:#fcc;"
		 | 8 
		 | June 28
		 | @ Minnesota
		 | 
		 | Candace Parker (17)
		 | Candace Parker (11)
		 | Candace Parker (6)
		 | Target Center8814
		 | 5–3
|- style="background:#fcc;"
		 | 9 
		 | June 29
		 | @ Chicago
		 | 
		 | Candace Parker (23)
		 | Candace Parker (9)
		 | Candace Parker (4)
		 | Allstate Arena6885
		 | 5–4

|- style="background:#cfc;"
		 | 10 
		 | July 2
		 |  Minnesota
		 | 
		 | Candace Parker (27)
		 | Nneka Ogwumike (10)
		 | Kristi Toliver (9)
		 | Staples Center7856
		 | 6–4
|- style="background:#cfc;"
		 | 11 
		 | July 4
		 |  NY Liberty
		 | 
		 | Kristi Toliver (29)
		 | Candace Parker (8)
		 | Lindsey Harding (8)
		 | Staples Center8565
		 | 7–4
|- style="background:#cfc;"
		 | 12 
		 | July 6
		 |  San Antonio
		 | 
		 | Nneka Ogwumike (24)
		 | Nneka Ogwumike (16)
		 | Parker & Harding (3)
		 | Staples Center9807
		 | 8–4
|- style="background:#cfc;"
		 | 13 
		 | July 11
		 | @ Tulsa
		 | 
		 | Candace Parker (30)
		 | Candace Parker (8)
		 | Lindsey Harding (8)
		 | BOK Center6278
		 | 9–4
|- style="background:#cfc;"
		 | 14 
		 | July 14
		 | @ Phoenix
		 | 
		 | Candace Parker (21)
		 | Nneka Ogwumike (13)
		 | Kristi Toliver (6)
		 | US Airways Center8233
		 | 10–4
|- style="background:#cfc;"
		 | 15 
		 | July 17
		 |  Atlanta
		 | 
		 | Kristi Toliver (15)
		 | Candace Parker (10)
		 | Lindsey Harding (6)
		 | Staples Center10876
		 | 11–4
|- style="background:#fcc;"
		 | 16 
		 | July 18
		 |  Phoenix
		 | 
		 | Candace Parker (25)
		 | Candace Parker (16)
		 | Jenna O'Hea (5)
		 | Staples Center11105
		 | 11–5
|- style="background:#cfc;"
		 | 17 
		 | July 20
		 | @ Seattle
		 | 
		 | Nneka Ogwumike (24)
		 | Nneka Ogwumike (9)
		 | Lindsey Harding (8)
		 | Key Arena6357
		 | 12–5
|- style="background:#fcc;"
		 | 18 
		 | July 25
		 |  Seattle
		 | 
		 | Candace Parker (24)
		 | Candace Parker (10)
		 | Kristi Toliver (3)
		 | Staples Center12651
		 | 12–6

|- align="center"
|colspan="9" bgcolor="#bbcaff"|All-Star Break
|- style="background:#fcc;"
		 | 19 
		 | August 2
		 | @ Tulsa
		 | 
		 | Kristi Toliver (23)
		 | Nneka Ogwumike (11)
		 | Lindsey Harding (6)
		 | BOK Center6168
		 | 12–7
|- style="background:#cfc;"
		 | 20 
		 | August 4
		 | @ Washington
		 | 
		 | Nneka Ogwumike (22)
		 | Jantel Lavender (11)
		 | Lindsey Harding (14)
		 | Verizon Center7092
		 | 13–7
|- style="background:#cfc;"
		 | 21 
		 | August 6
		 | @ Connecticut
		 | 
		 | Kristi Toliver (19)
		 | Ogwumike & Toliver (9)
		 | Toliver & Harding (4)
		 | Mohegan Sun Arena5792
		 | 14–7
|- style="background:#cfc;"
		 | 22 
		 | August 8
		 | @ Indiana
		 | 
		 | Jantel Lavender (18)
		 | Jantel Lavender (9)
		 | Lindsey Harding (5)
		 | Bankers Life Fieldhouse7076
		 | 15–7
|- style="background:#cfc;"
		 | 23 
		 | August 10
		 | @ NY Liberty
		 | 
		 | Jantel Lavender (18)
		 | Jantel Lavender (8)
		 | Lindsey Harding (4)
		 | Prudential Center7569
		 | 16–7
|- style="background:#cfc;"
		 | 24 
		 | August 13
		 |  Chicago
		 | 
		 | Candace Parker (18)
		 | Ogwumike, Parker, & Lavender (7)
		 | Parker, Toliver, & Coleman (4)
		 | Staples Center10553
		 | 17–7
|- style="background:#cfc;"
		 | 25 
		 | August 16
		 |  Indiana
		 | 
		 | Kristi Toliver (28)
		 | Nneka Ogwumike (7)
		 | Lindsey Harding (7)
		 | Staples Center11801
		 | 18–7
|- style="background:#fcc;"
		 | 26 
		 | August 20
		 | @ Seattle
		 | 
		 | Nneka Ogwumike (12)
		 | Candace Parker (10)
		 | Parker & Harding (3)
		 | Key Arena6738
		 | 18–8
|- style="background:#cfc;"
		 | 27 
		 | August 25
		 |  Tulsa
		 | 
		 | Candace Parker (26)
		 | Candace Parker (11)
		 | Candace Parker (9)
		 | Staples Center9973
		 | 19–8
|- style="background:#cfc;"
		 | 28 
		 | August 27
		 |  Connecticut
		 | 
		 | Candace Parker (28)
		 | Nneka Ogwumike (12)
		 | Candace Parker (7)
		 | Staples Center11401
		 | 20–8
|- style="background:#cfc;"
		 | 29 
		 | August 31
		 | @ San Antonio
		 | 
		 | Nneka Ogwumike (19)
		 | Candace Parker (11)
		 | Kristi Toliver (7)
		 | AT&T Center8086
		 | 21–8

|- style="background:#fcc;"
		 | 30 
		 | September 2
		 | @ Atlanta
		 | 
		 | Nneka Ogwumike (17)
		 | Nneka Ogwumike (10)
		 | Kristi Toliver (9)
		 | Philips Arena5504
		 | 21–9
|- style="background:#fcc;"
		 | 31 
		 | September 4
		 | @ Minnesota
		 | 
		 | Candace Parker (25)
		 | Candace Parker (8)
		 | Nneka Ogwumike (4)
		 | Target Center9314
		 | 21–10
|- style="background:#cfc;"
		 | 32 
		 | September 6
		 | @ Tulsa
		 | 
		 | Candace Parker (20)
		 | Candace Parker (9)
		 | Lindsey Harding (10)
		 | BOK Center6704
		 | 22–10
|- style="background:#cfc;"
		 | 33 
		 | September 12
		 |  Minnesota
		 | 
		 | Nneka Ogwumike (25)
		 | Nneka Ogwumike (11)
		 | Parker & Toliver (4)
		 | Staples Center11553
		 | 23–10
|- style="background:#cfc;"
		 | 34 
		 | September 15
		 |  Phoenix
		 | 
		 | Parker & Lavender (16)
		 | Jantel Lavender (9)
		 | Lindsey Harding (5)
		 | Staples Center12311
		 | 24–10

Playoffs

|- style="background:#fcc;"
		 | 1 
		 | September 19
		 |  Phoenix
		 | 
		 | Candace Parker (28)
		 | Nneka Ogwumike (14)
		 | Lindsey Harding (5)
		 | Staples Center8500
		 | 0–1
|- style="background:#cfc;"
		 | 2 
		 | September 21
		 | @ Phoenix
		 | 
		 | Candace Parker (31)
		 | Ogwumike & Parker (11)
		 | Lindsey Harding (4)
		 | US Airways Center11110
		 | 1–1
|- style="background:#fcc;"
		 | 3 
		 | September 23
		 |  Phoenix
		 | 
		 | Kristi Toliver (22)
		 | Nneka Ogwumike (10)
		 | Toliver & Coleman (3)
		 | Staples Center9321
		 | 1–2

Statistics

Regular season

Awards and honors

Footnotes

References

External links

Los Angeles Sparks seasons
Los Angeles
Los Angeles Sparks